The War of the Oxen is a 1943 German  historical film directed by Hans Deppe and starring Elfriede Datzig, Paul Richter and Wastl Lichtmanegger. It is an adaptation of Ludwig Ganghofer's 1914 novel of the same title.

Location shooting took place in the Bavarian Alps.

Cast
 Elfriede Datzig as Julia Someiner
 Paul Richter as Lampert Someiner
 Wastl Lichtmanegger as Jakob Someiner
 Willy Rösner as Runotter
 Fritz Kampers as Malimmes
 Ernst Sattler as Amtmann Someiner
 Thea Aichbichler as Marianne Someiner
 Ludwig Schmid-Wildy as Marimpfel
 Ernst Stahl-Nachbaur as Heinrich von Burghausen
 Friedrich Ulmer as Peter Pienzenauer
 Georg Vogelsang as Schwarzecker
 Carl Ehrhardt-Hardt as Sigwart
 Hans Schulz as Heiner
 Rolf Pinegger as Ruechsam
 Walter Ladengast as Ludwig von Ingolstadt
 Hans Baumann as Landvogt
 Karl Günther as Seipersdorfer
 Hans Hanauer as Lahner
 Harry Hardt as Wolfl
 Herbert Hübner
 Walter Janssen as Franziskus
 Leopold Kerscher as Achenauer
 Ludwig Rupert as Hinterseer
 Norbert Rohringer

References

Bibliography
 Goble, Alan. The Complete Index to Literary Sources in Film. Walter de Gruyter, 1999.

External links 
 

1943 films
1940s historical films
German historical films
Films of Nazi Germany
1940s German-language films
Films directed by Hans Deppe
Films set in Bavaria
Films set in the Holy Roman Empire
Films set in the 1420s
Films based on German novels
Films based on works by Ludwig Ganghofer
Films set in the Alps
German black-and-white films
UFA GmbH films
Films scored by Ludwig Schmidseder
1940s German films